MiO is a liquid beverage mix owned by Kraft Heinz, which intends it as an additive to flavor water, carbonated water, and other beverages. In 2019, MiO launched a line of powdered beverage mixes in addition to its liquid offerings.

Ingredients
MiO products are artificially colored and sweetened with concentrated syrups. Caffeinated variants of the MiO brand are marketed as MiO Energy. This version of the product contains 60 mg of caffeine per serving. MiO is listed as containing less than 2% natural flavors. Other listed ingredients are citric acid, malic acid, sucralose, acesulfame potassium, potassium citrate, gum arabic, sucrose acetate isobutyrate, Red 40, Blue 1, and potassium sorbate.

Canada
The MiO Energy variant of MiO is not sold in Canada. MiO Electrolytes, however, is available in Canada.

Advertising
MiO advertising initially centered on The Second City character Sassy Gay Friend, portrayed by comedian-actor Brian Gallivan. Gallivan had already created comedy videos that featured this character in stories from literature or history (such as Romeo & Juliet). He began adding short dialogs about the product into these clips. His slogan for the product was "Flip it. Tip it. Sip it!" In two later "man on the street" style videos, he demonstrates the product to passers-by.

MiO later started an advertisement campaign with the slogan "Make it Yours, Make it MiO". This advertising featured animated animals discussing the product.

See also
 Borg (drink)

References

External links
 

Drink brands
Products introduced in 2011
Kraft Foods brands
Non-alcoholic drinks